Betty Boop's Life Guard is a 1934 Fleischer Studios animated short film starring Betty Boop.

Plot

Betty is spending the day at the beach, where her boyfriend Fearless Freddy works as a life guard.  Betty is enjoying the ocean while floating in her inflatable rubber horsey when it springs a leak.  Freddy dives in to save Betty, but she goes under, where she begins to imagine she's a mermaid.  At first Betty enjoys her new underwater life, swimming and singing with the other undersea inhabitants.  The fun ends when a sea monster chases her.  Just before the monster catches her, she wakes up, safe in Freddy's arms.

Notes and comments

This is the first Post-Code Betty Boop cartoon. The Hays Office ordered the removal of the suggestive curtain introduction which had started the cartoons until then because Betty Boop's winks and shaking of her hips was deemed "suggestive of immorality."
This cartoon featured the second appearance of Betty's boyfriend Fearless Freddy.
This was released just 13 days after the Hays-Code affected on July 1, 1934.

References

External links
 Betty Boop's Life Guard at the Big Cartoon Database.
 Betty Boop's Life Guard on YouTube.
 

1934 films
Betty Boop cartoons
1930s American animated films
American black-and-white films
1934 animated films
Paramount Pictures short films
Fleischer Studios short films
Short films directed by Dave Fleischer
Films about lifeguards
Films about mermaids
Films set on beaches